Palito Blanco is an unincorporated community off Farm Road 735, situated fifteen miles southwest of Alice in west central Jim Wells County, Texas, United States.

History
The site was first settled by Mexican ranchers who according to local legend named the town for the hackberry trees that grew in the area; however, palito blanco is Spanish for "white stick." The community had a population of twenty-five in 1891. A post office named Palito Blanco was established at the site in 1916, discontinued shortly afterwards, and reactivated in 1928. By 1933 Palito Blanco had an estimated population of twenty and five businesses. In 1936 the town included one school, two cemeteries, four businesses, multiple farm units, and various dwellings. The town's population had increased to 100 by 1943 but by 1950 had dropped to forty. During the 1950s and 1960s Palito Blanco's population remained constant, and by 1963 the town included two schools, San José church, and several dispersed dwellings. Palito Blanco saw little change during the 1970s and 1980s, and in 1990 the population was thirty-five.

Geography
Palito Blanco is located at 27°35′30″N 98°11′21″W.

Education
Palito Blanco is served by the Ben Bolt-Palito Blanco ISD.

Notable people 
 Sylvia Garcia, former Texas State Senator and current U.S. House of Representatives.

External links
 Palito Blanco Community Website
 

Cities in Jim Wells County, Texas
Cities in Texas